McManus House may refer to:

McManus House (Davenport, Iowa)
Richardson House (Brunswick, Maine), also known as the Captain George McManus House
George McManus House, Petoskey, Michigan
Patrick F. McManus House, Phoenix, Oregon